The Roman Catholic Diocese of Matadi is a diocese located in the city of Matadi  in the Ecclesiastical province of Kinshasa in the Democratic Republic of the Congo.

History
 July 1, 1911: Established as Apostolic Prefecture of Matadi from the Apostolic Vicariate of Léopoldville
 July 23, 1930: Promoted as Apostolic Vicariate of Matadi
 November 10, 1959: Promoted as Diocese of Matadi

Bishops
 Prefect Apostolic of Matadi (Latin Rite) 
 Fr. Giuseppe Heintz, C.SS.R. (1 August 1911 – 1928); see below
 Vicars Apostolic of Matadi (Latin Rite) 
Giuseppe Heintz, C.SS.R. (1 Aug 1911 - 1928); see above
Jean Cuvelier, C.SS.R. (28 Jun 1929 - May 1938) 
 Bishops of Matadi (Roman rite)
Alphonse Marie Van den Bosch, C.SS.R. (14 Jun 1938 - 18 Dec 1965) 
Simon N'Zita Wa Ne Malanda (18 Dec 1965 - 8 Mar 1985) 
Raphaël Lubaki Nganga (8 Mar 1985 - 26 Mar 1987) 
Gabriel Kembo Mamputu (21 Jun 1988 - 21 Sep 2010)
Daniel Nlandu Mayi (21 Sep 2010 - 6 Mar 2021)
	André Giraud Pindi Muanza (23 Apr 2022 - present)

Coadjutor bishops
Raphaël Lubaki Nganga (1971-1985)
Daniel Nlandu Mayi (2008-2010)

Auxiliary bishop
Simon N’Zita Wa Ne Malanda (1960-1965), appointed Bishop here

See also
Roman Catholicism in the Democratic Republic of the Congo

Sources
 GCatholic.org
 Catholic Hierarchy

Matadi
Roman Catholic dioceses in the Democratic Republic of the Congo
Christian organizations established in 1911
Roman Catholic dioceses and prelatures established in the 20th century
Roman Catholic Ecclesiastical Province of Kinshasa